Leon Hammel (born 24 April 1996) is a German footballer who plays as a right-back for SC Hessen Dreieich.

References

External links
 
 Leon Hammel at Fupa

1996 births
Living people
Footballers from Frankfurt
German footballers
Association football fullbacks
FSV Frankfurt players
Regionalliga players
3. Liga players
SC Hessen Dreieich players